Li Zhuchen (September 16, 1882 – October 7, 1968) was a Chinese male politician, who served as the vice chairperson of the Chinese People's Political Consultative Conference.

References 

1882 births
1968 deaths
Vice Chairpersons of the National Committee of the Chinese People's Political Consultative Conference